Svetlana Kuznetsova was the defending champion, but chose not to play that year.

Lindsay Davenport won the title in her first tournament in 51 weeks, beating Daniela Hantuchová 6–4, 3–6, 6–2 in the final.

Seeds
The top two seeds received a bye into the second round.

Draw

Finals

Top half

Bottom half

Commonwealth Bank Tennis Classic
Commonwealth Bank Tennis Classic